Gunnar Vilhelm Henriksson (22 August 1905, Helsinki – 13 February 1974) was a Finnish journalist and politician. He was a member of the Parliament of Finland from 1948 to 1966, representing the Social Democratic Party of Finland (SDP). During the Continuation War, he was one of the signatories of the "Petition of the Thirty-Three", which members of the peace opposition presented to President Ryti on 20 August 1943.

References

1905 births
1974 deaths
Politicians from Helsinki
People from Uusimaa Province (Grand Duchy of Finland)
Swedish-speaking Finns
Social Democratic Party of Finland politicians
Members of the Parliament of Finland (1948–51)
Members of the Parliament of Finland (1951–54)
Members of the Parliament of Finland (1954–58)
Members of the Parliament of Finland (1958–62)
Members of the Parliament of Finland (1962–66)
Finnish people of World War II
Writers from Helsinki
20th-century Finnish journalists